Chelo may refer to:

People
 Chelo Alonso (1933–2019), Cuban actress Isabel Apolonia García Hernández, who worked in Italian cinema
 Chelo Alvarez-Stehle, Spanish and American journalist and documentary filmmaker
 Chelo García-Cortés (born 1951), Spanish journalist María Consolación García-Cortés Cadavid
 Marcello Pisas (born 1977), football goalkeeper from Curaçao
 Consuelo Silva (born 1922), American singer of Mexican bolero music
 Chelo Vivares (born 1952), Spanish actress and voice actress Consuelo Vivares
 Chelo (American singer), American singer, rapper and choreographer
 Chelo (Mexican singer) (born 1943), Mexican singer, songwriter and actress
 Isaac Chelo, 14th century Spanish rabbi and the alleged author of a forged travel itinerary

Places
 Chelo District, Khuzestan Province, Iran
 Chelo Rural District, Chelo District

See also
 Celo (disambiguation)
 Čelo (disambiguation)
 Cello (disambiguation)